Hopewell is an unincorporated community in Tipton County, Tennessee, United States. It lies at an elevation of 413 feet (126 m).

References

Unincorporated communities in Tipton County, Tennessee
Unincorporated communities in Tennessee